Super Junior-K.R.Y. is the first sub-unit of South Korean boy  band Super Junior, formed in 2006. it is composed the three main vocalists of Super Junior, Yesung, Ryeowook, and Kyuhyun.

History
During the year 2006, Kyuhyun, Ryeowook and Yesung under the name Super Junior-K.R.Y. (from the first letter of the members' stage names) released two original soundtrack titled "The Night Chicago Died" and "The One I Love" for the
tvN drama Hyena. On November 5, 2006, they debuted on the music program Music Bank with performing "The One I Love". Since then, they have released several original soundtracks for Korean television dramas.

Super Junior-K.R.Y. held their first concert tour in Asia in 2010–2011. The tour commenced in Tokyo in August 2010 and continued onto Kobe, Taipei, Fukuoka, Seoul, and concluding in Nanjing, China. Over 22,000 people attended the tour. Super Junior members Donghae, Sungmin and Heechul made special guest appearances at the Seoul concerts, as well as labelmates Shinee and TRAX.

Super Junior K.R.Y. Special Winter Concert 2012 was held in Yokohama on November 19–21 with 15,000 fans in the audience. Super Junior K.R.Y. released some tracks and a teaser video from their upcoming Japanese single "Promise You" for the first time at the concerts. Tickets for the concerts in Yokohama went on sale on October 27 and were sold out in three seconds. There were performances in Kobe and Tokyo in December and January. The tour mobilised 36,000 people in Tokyo, with a total of 72,000 in all three cities and nine concerts. The application for the tickets was over 1,500,000, and proved their popularity in Japan.

Super Junior-K.R.Y. released their first official single in Japan titled "Promise You" on January 23, 2013, and debuted at number two on Oricon's daily singles chart. In total, the single album sold 40,645 copies on its first day of sales on January 23. In the next day the single album ranked 1st place by selling 15,197 copies. In the first week of sales "Promise You" sold 69,067 copies, ranking 2nd place in Oricon Weekly Chart. On May 6, 2013, member Yesung was enlisted for his mandatory military service. It made the sub-group hiatus from their activities.

Yesung completed his mandatory military service on May 4, 2015. They continued their activities as a trio with held Japanese tour, starting in Yokohama on June 2–3 and had 11 total performances in arenas in Kobe, Fukuoka and Nagoya. In June 2015, the trio announced will be released their second Japanese single titled "Join Hands" on 5 August 2015.
In July 2015, SM Entertainment announced Super Junior-K.R.Y. will be held their Asia tour started at the Seoul's Olympic Hall on August 22 and 23. Ryeowook enlisted for his military service on 11 October 2016 while Kyuhyun enlisted for his military service on May 25, 2017. As a result, the sub-group has temporarily halted their activities. Ryeowook and Kyuhyun were discharged on July 10, 2018, and May 7, 2019, respectively.

They made their comeback appearance at the Jeddah Season Festival on July 13, 2019. On December 31, 2019, they performed at Taoyuan New Year's Eve stage in Taiwan.

In May 2020, it was announced that Super Junior K.R.Y will have their first Korean release since their unit's debut in 2006, with an EP titled When We Were Us, which was released on June 8. The EP is part of a chain of activities to celebrate 15 years since formation for Super Junior, from 2005 till 2020. They subsequently released a Japanese single, "Traveler" on October 27, with the Japanese version of "When We Were Us" as its B-side. The single peaked at number one on Oricon Daily Singles Chart.

Discography

Extended plays

Singles

Soundtrack appearances

Other appearances

Videography

Concert tours

Asia Tour
 Super Junior-K.R.Y. The 1st Concert (2010–2011)
 Super Junior-K.R.Y. Asia Tour Phonograph  (2015)

Japan Tour
 Super Junior-K.R.Y. Special Winter Concert (2012–2013)
 Super Junior-K.R.Y. Japan Tour Phonograph (2015)

Online concerts
 Super Junior-K.R.Y. - The Moment With Us (2020)

Awards and nominations

Notes

References

External links

  
  

Super Junior subgroups
South Korean boy bands
Musical groups established in 2006
2006 establishments in South Korea
SM Entertainment artists
K-pop music groups
SM Town
South Korean musical trios
Japanese-language singers of South Korea
Musical groups from Seoul